Bihar (in eastern India is one of the oldest inhabited places in the world with a history going back 3000 years. The rich culture and heritage of Bihar is evident from the innumerable ancient monuments that are dotted all over the state. Bihar is home to many tourist attractions and is visited by large numbers of tourists from all over the world. Around total 6 million tourists visit Bihar every year.

Megasthenes (B.C. 350–290 B.C.) visited the region in reign of Chandragupta Maurya.His observations were recorded in Indika. Dionysius was son of Megasthenes, who visited Pataliputra in reign of Ashoka. Hsuan-Tsang and I Ching visited Nalanda to study in the 7th century

Monuments and museums

Monuments 
 Mahabodhi Mahavihar, (literally: "Great Awakening Temple"), a UNESCO World Heritage Site, is an ancient, but much rebuilt and restored, Buddhist temple in Bodh Gaya, marking the location where the Buddha is said to have attained enlightenment. Nalanda Mahavihara, a UNESCO World Heritage Site, is an worlds oldest university situated in Nalanda , Bihar. It comprises the archaeological remains of a monastic and scholastic institution dating from the 3rd century BCE to the 13th century CE. It includes stupas, shrines, viharas (residential and educational buildings) and important art works in stucco, stone and metal. Nalanda stands out as the most ancient university of the Indian Subcontinent. Archaeological Survey of India has recognized 72 monuments in Bihar as Monuments of National Importance. Furthermore, Archaeological Survey of India has recognized 30 additional monument as protected monuments in Bihar. These monument identifier is  monuments and distributed across the Bihar.

Museums

Religious tourism 
Bihar one of the most sacred place of various religions like Hinduism, Buddhism, Jainism, Sikhism & Islam, Many tourist travel to Bihar to visit their pilgrimage. Mahabodhi Temple, a Buddhist shrine and UNESCO World Heritage Site, is also situated in Bodh Gaya. A Mahavir Mandir, Patna having second highest budget in North India after the famous Vaishno Devi shrine.

Dharmic religions 

The term 'Bihar' derives from the Sanskrit word 'Vihāra', which means abode and it itself explains the relation of Bihar with the viharas, used as the Buddhist abode. The land of Bihar is considered to be the richest one in context of Buddhism as it showered the divine light of enlightenment on a young ascetic, Siddhartha Gautama, in Bodh Gaya under Bodhi Tree. This makes Bodh Gaya is a holiest site in Buddhism and place of pilgrimage associated with the Mahabodhi Temple Complex in Gaya district in the Indian state of Bihar. The Gautama Buddha preached many sermons in different places of like Vaishali and Rajgir. Even after His Mahaprinirvana, disciples carried on the doctrine of Buddhism in the regions of Magadha, Bihar. Gautama Buddha's disciples opened several monasteries and Universities such as Nalanda University  and Vikramshila University. Magadha emperor Ashoka the Great became a Buddhist and made Buddhism state religion and spread its doctrine, in different parts of India and abroad.

The capital of Bihar, Patna is one of the holiest city in Sikhism, as The tenth Guru of the Sikhs Guru Gobind Singh was born here in 1666 and spent his early years before moving to Anandpur. Patna was also honoured by visits from Guru Nanak in 1509 as well as Guru Tegh Bahadur in 1666. Takht Shri Harmandir Saheb, one of the Five Takhts of the Sikhism, is a Gurdwara situated in Patna  and it is made in remembrance of the birthplace of Guru Gobind Singh, The tenth Guru of the Sikhs. Gurdwara Pahila Bara, also known as Gurdwara Ghai Ghat, is dedicated to Guru Nanak Dev, who during his visit in to Patna stayed here in 1509 and later by Guru Tegh Bahadur along with his family visited this place in 1666. Gurdwara Gobind Ghat - is where the child Guru Gobind Singh used to play with his playmates on the bank of the Ganges. It is situated on the bank of river Ganges and hardly 200 yards from Takht Shri Harmandir Saheb. It is also known as Gurdwara Kangan Ghat. Guru ka Bagh and Gurdwara Bal Leela is situated near birthplace of Guru Gobind Singh.- This place is just few meters away from Takhat Patna Sahib. Guru ji were playing with other children during his childhood. Gurdwara Bal Leela is also known as Maini Sangat. Gurdwara Handi Sahib was built in the memory of Guru Teg Bahadur. As Guru Teg Bahadur with Mata Gujri and Bala Preetam stayed here in 1728

Rajgir is birthplace of Munisuvrata, the twentieth Jain tirthankara and Pawapuri is nirvana place of Mahavira the last Jain tirthankara. Pataliputra and Vaishali is significant religious place in Jainism. The tallest statue of Jain tirthankara Vasupujya which stands 31 feet in height was built in Champapuri in 2014. The Panch Kalyanak Pratishtha Mahotsav of the statue was done from 27 Feb to 3 Mar 2014. Kamaldah Jain Temple is the oldest Jain temple in Patna built in 18th century. This temple belonging to digambar sect of Jainism, is dedicated to Neminatha, the 22nd tirthankara. This place has traditionally been associated with the birth of the renowned Jain teacher, Sthulabhadra.

Abrahamic religions
Maner Sharif is the place where Makhdum Daulat in 1608 breathed his last. It was then in 1616 that Ibrahim Khan, Governor of Bihar who was also his disciple, finished the construction of his mausoleum. Bihar Sharif and Phulwari Sharif is sufism center which has cultural past. Sher Shah Suri Mosque, also known as Shershahi, was built in Afghan architecture by Sher Shah Suri during1540-1545 to commemorate his reign. Pathar ki Masjid situated on the bank of the holy river Ganges in Patna and it was built by Parvez Shah, son of Jahangir, in 1621.

Virgin Mary Church, also as Padari ki haveli, is the oldest church in Bihar and it was built in 1713 in Patna by Roman Catholics. . Holy Saviour Church of Arrah is also historically important site.

In 2012, the Universal House of Justice announced the locations of the first local Baháʼí Houses of Worship that would be built. One of the specified locations was in Bihar Sharif, Bihar, India. In April 2020, the design for the Bihar Sharif House of Worship was unveiled. In February 2021, a groundbreaking ceremony for the temple was held.

Architectural tourism 

The first significant architectural pieces in Bihar date back to the Vedic period. While the Mauryan period marked a transition to the use of brick and stone, wood remained the material of choice. Evidence of ancient structures have been found in recent excavations in Kumrahar, in modern-day Patna. Remains of an 80-pillared hall have also been unearthed. The Buddhist stupa, a dome-shaped monument, was and is used in Bihar as a commemorative monument used to enshrine sacred relics. Many stupas, like those at Nalanda and Vikramshila, were originally built as brick and masonry mounds during the reign of Ashoka (273 BCE - 232 BCE).  Fortified cities with stūpas, viharas, and temples were constructed during the Maurya empire (c. 321–185 BCE). Guard rails—consisting of posts, crossbars, and a coping—became a safety feature surrounding a stupa. Some of Buddhist architecture blended with Roman and Hellenestic architecture to give rise to unique new styles, such as the Greco-Buddhist style. Vedic and Mauryan structure was largely suffered damage at the hands of Mughal raiders in the 12th century. Though parts of the Bihar have been excavated, much of its ancient architecture still lies buried beneath the modern city. Persian influence can be seen in surviving Mughal tombs made of sandstone and marble. Surviving Mughal architecture includes Sher Shah Suri Tomb, built by Sher Shah Suri and his successor. Ibrahim Khan, Governor of Bihar and a disciple of Makhdum Daulat, oversaw the completion of Makhdum Daulat mausoleum in 1616. Another example of Mughal architecture is the building at Maner Sharif.  The domed building features walls adorned with intricate designs and a ceiling full of inscriptions from the Quran. Patna High Court, Bihar Vidhan Sabha, Bihar Vidhan Parishad, Transport Bhawan, Patna, Golghar St. Mary's Church and Patna Museum are some example of Indo-Saracenic Architectures.

Ecological tourism

National parks, sanctuaries, and safaris

Water bodies

Hills and caves

Adventure tourism 
 Pandu Pokhar

Event tourism 

Chhath, a is an ancient and major Vedic festival celebrated in Bihar. It is celebrated twice a year: once in the summers, called the Chaiti Chhath, and once around a week after Deepawali, called the Karthik Chhath. The Karthik Chhath is more popular because winters are the usual festive season in Bihar.

Cultural tourism

Gastronomical tourism

Educational tourism
In the past, tourism in the region was purely based on educational tourism, as Bihar was home of some prominent ancient universities like Nalanda and Vikramashila.

Tourists

Connectivity and access

Bihar is also an important transit point for the tourists dropping in from the other states of India. Bihar is well-connected by air, rail and road transport.
 By air
Patna has its own airport known as Lok Nayak Jayaprakash Airport or Airport Patna. It is a national airport and it is connected to all major cities of India via daily flights.
Gaya Airport is the only international airport in Bihar and Jharkhand which 96 km from Patna. It is an international airport which is connected to Colombo, Sri Lanka through two airline operators: Bangkok, Thailand, Singapore, and Bhutan.Third Domestic Airport is Darbhanga Airport.
 By rail
Bihar is strategically located in the main line of the East Central Railway and therefore connected with important cities of India and most cities within Bihar.
 By road
The cities of Bihar are well connected by public transport including both private and government transport. The cities are interconnected as well as connected with the capital. The roadways also connected to adjacent states and regular bus service is available for different cities of adjacent states like Jharkhand, West Bengal, Uttar Pradesh. The roadways also connects to Nepal. To boost the state roadways, the state government have introduced Mercedes Benz luxury buses. The Mercedes luxury buses, 92 in number, ply between 17 routes including Patna, Bhagalpur, Gaya, Ranchi and Jamshedpur.

See also

 Tourism in Patna
 Tourism in India
 Tourism in North East India
 List of World Heritage Sites in India
 List of national parks of India
 List of lakes of India
 List of waterfalls in India
 List of State Protected Monuments in India
 List of beaches in India
 Incredible India
 List of Geographical Indications in India
 Medical tourism in India
 List of botanical gardens in India
 List of hill stations in India
 List of gates in India
 List of zoos in India
 List of protected areas of India
 List of aquaria in India
 List of forts in India
 List of forests in India
 Buddhist pilgrimage sites in India
 Hindu pilgrimage sites in India
 List of rock-cut temples in India
 Wildlife sanctuaries of India
 List of rivers of India
 List of mountains in India
 List of ecoregions in India
 Coral reefs in India
 List of stadiums in India

References

External links

 Bihar Tourism Best Places
 Bihar Tourism Official website 
 Official website Of Directorate of Tourism, Bihar
 Official website Of Bihar Tourism Development Corporation
 Bihar Trip